Finnsnes Church is a parish church of the Church of Norway in Senja Municipality in Troms og Finnmark county, Norway.  It is located in the central part of the town of Finnsnes. It is a church in the Lenvik parish which is part of the Senja prosti (deanery) in the Diocese of Nord-Hålogaland. The white, brick church was built in a fan-shaped style in 1979 using plans drawn up by the architect Nils Toft. The church seats about 750 people. The building was consecrated by Bishop Kristen Kyrre Bremer.

Media gallery

See also
List of churches in Nord-Hålogaland

References

Senja
Churches in Troms
Brick churches in Norway
20th-century Church of Norway church buildings
Churches completed in 1979
1979 establishments in Norway
Fan-shaped churches in Norway